The 2015 British Supersport Championship was the 28th British Supersport Championship season. It began at Donington Park on 5 April and ended at the Brands Hatch GP circuit on 18 October. Defending champion Billy McConnell moved to the British Superbike Championship for 2015, and did not defend his title.

Race calendar and results

Championship standings

Riders' championship

References

External links

British Supersport
Supersport
British Supersport Championship